The 1786 English cricket season was the 15th in which matches have been awarded retrospective first-class cricket status and the last before the Marylebone Cricket Club was founded in 1787. The season saw five top-class matches played in the country.

Matches 
Five first-class matches for which scorecards exist were played during the year, four of them involving sides playing under the name of Kent. The season saw the first "great" matches played by the White Conduit Club, the direct predecessor of the Marylebone Cricket Club which was formed the following year. One of these matches saw Tom Walker scored 95 and 102 runs in his two innings, a pair of scores considered "an astonishing double by the standards of the day".

In another match, Tom Sueter of Hampshire was given out hit the ball twice, the first time that this method if dismissal is recorded in a first-class scorecard.

First mentions
 Harry Walker
 Tom Walker

References

Further reading
 
 
 
 
 

1786 in English cricket
English cricket seasons in the 18th century